Sir Syed Ali Imam, CSI, KCSI (11 February 1869 – 31 October 1932), also known as Sir Saiyid Ali Imam, was an Indian Barrister and freedom fighter who was the first Indian to represent India at the round table of 1929. He served as Prime Minister of Hyderabad State. He was one of the founders of Modern Bihar.

Biography

Syed Ali Imam was born on February 11, 1869, in Neora village, Bihar. The son of Nawab Syed Imdad Imam and the brother of Syed Hasan Imam.  In 1887, he went to London to study law and was called to the English bar by the Middle Temple. He returned to India in 1890. He was a member of the Bihar District Board. In 1909, he was appointed to the Bengal Legislative Council.

In 1917, Imam was appointed a Justice of the Patna High Court. Later, he worked as the Chief Minister of the Hyderabad State. After that, he resumed private practice in 1920 and joined the Indian independence movement. Imam served as President of Muslim League. He was knighted in 1908. He was a Law member of the Imperial Legislative Council. He was responsible for convincing the board to move the capital city of Kolkata to Delhi.

Imam spoke several languages and was a good orator. On October 17, 1932, he died in Ranchi and was buried at Kokar Chowk in Hazaribagh road.

References

External links 

 

1869 births
1932 deaths
Bihari politicians
Indian barristers
Indian Shia Muslims
Politicians from Patna
20th-century Indian lawyers
Knights Commander of the Order of the Star of India
Indian knights
Members of the Middle Temple
Judges of the Patna High Court